The Harwell Science and Innovation Campus is a 700-acre science and technology campus in Oxfordshire, England. Over 6,000 people work there in over 240 public and private sector organisations, working across sectors including Space, Clean Energy, Life Sciences and Quantum Computing.

A large part of the site was formerly the main research establishment of the United Kingdom Atomic Energy Authority, but it has seen a transition to its new role as a science and business park as the nuclear facilities have been decommissioned.

The campus today 

Over 6,000 people work on the campus in some 240 organisations representing a multidisciplinary range of advanced scientific and technological disciplines. Major companies and organisations on the site include:

 Diamond Light Source Synchrotron
 The STFC 
 Rutherford Appleton Laboratory
 Central Laser Facility
 ISIS Neutron and Muon Source

Space Cluster Organisations
 European Space Agency
 Oxford Space Systems
 RAL Space
 Astroscale
 ClearSpace Today

Life Sciences and HealthTech Organisations
 Oxford Nanopore
 Medical Research Council Harwell Institute
 UK Health Security Agency (previously known as Public Health England)
 AMEC Foster Wheeler
 Nuvia
 The Rosalind Franklin Institute

Energy Organisations
 The Faraday Institution
 United Kingdom Atomic Energy Authority
 AEA Technology
 Jisc
RHEA Group

The National Quantum Computing Centre will also be built at Harwell Campus.

The campus is owned by the UKAEA, the Science and Technology Facilities Council and Public Health England. It is managed by the Harwell Science and Innovation Campus joint venture partnership.

History

Atomic Energy Research Establishment

The northern part of the Campus was formerly the Atomic Energy Research Establishment, which was created after the Second World War on the site of RAF Harwell. It was the main centre for atomic energy research and development in the United Kingdom from the 1940s to the 1990s, latterly being amalgamated into the United Kingdom Atomic Energy Authority. A number of test nuclear reactors were sited on the Campus over the years. The nuclear facilities are in the hands of the Nuclear Decommissioning Authority. As parts of the site are decommissioned, they are delicensed and dedesignated and no longer secured hence the area "inside the fence" is gradually shrinking. It is planned that the entire site will be decommissioned by 2025.

Achievements on the campus at this time included the creation of the world's first transistorised computer, CADET, in 1953 and the world's first experimental ‘fast’ reactor, ZEPHYR, was built in 1954.

Rutherford Appleton Laboratory 

In 1957 the Rutherford High Energy Laboratory (now the Rutherford Appleton Laboratory, RAL) was established on a site immediately south of the AERE.  This was followed in 1961 by the Atlas Computer Laboratory, absorbed into the Rutherford in 1974. The southern site, including the RAL, became known as the Chilton/Harwell Science Campus. RAL is operated by the Science and Technology Facilities Council (STFC), and its facilities include the ISIS neutron source.

In 2004, RAL Space engineered the Ptolemy instrument for the Philae lander on the European Space Agency's (ESA) Rosetta expedition

Between 2003 and 2007 the Diamond synchrotron was constructed on the RAL site, the UK's largest scientific investment for 30 years.

Harwell International Business Centre
As the former UKAEA site was being decommissioned, a new role became necessary to maintain levels of employment in the area, building on the site's reputation for pioneering research, and ensuring that Harwell remained one of the UK's major centres for science and technology. Therefore, in 1996, it was relaunched as a business park. One of the businesses on-site is the UKAEA spin-off company AEA Technology. As well as attracting numerous other hi-tech businesses, the Harwell IBC also has numerous amenities such as a bank, post office, hairdresser, sports facilities including a cricket pitch, and its own bus station.

Creation of the Science and Innovation campus 
In March 2006 the government announced plans to transform the Harwell International Business Centre into the Harwell Science and Innovation Campus. In August 2006 the government announced an investment of £26.4 million to construct new research facilities on the campus and the creation of a joint venture partnership.

European Space Agency ECSAT (Roy Gibson Building)
The European Space Agency moved into Harwell Science and Innovation Campus in May 2013.  It was the first ESA base in the UK. ESA then constructed and opened the Roy Gibson Building (named after ESA's first Director General) in July 2015.  The ESA facility, named European Centre for Space Applications and Telecommunications or ECSAT focuses upon three key areas: combining data and images from space to create new applications for everyday life; observations and research on climate change (the facility hosts ESA's Climate Office); and the development of novel power sources and innovative robotic technologies to explore space.

Harwell Campus is now a significant part of the UK space sector and over 100 space organisations are based there including the European Space Agency, RAL Space, Satellite Applications Catapult, Astroscale, ClearSpace Today and the UK Space Agency.

References

External links 
Harwell Campus Website
Research Sites Restoration Limited – Harwell
STFC Website Harwell Campus

Buildings and structures in Oxfordshire
Organisations based in Oxfordshire
Research institutes in Oxfordshire
Science parks in the United Kingdom
Vale of White Horse